Thang Kiang Nam Football Club or TKN is a defunct Malaysian football club based in Ipoh, Perak. The club used to play in the Malaysian League before withdrawing their participation in 2004. 

The club finished last in 2003 Malaysia Premier League 2 and play their last season in Malaysian League in 2004 before withdrew their participation and returns to State League.

References

Football clubs in Malaysia
Defunct football clubs in Malaysia